The Malaysia national handball team is the national team of Malaysia. It is governed by the Malaysia Handball Association and takes part in international handball competitions.

External links
IHF profile

Men's national handball teams